The Chinese Ambassador to North Korea is the official representative of the People's Republic of China to the Democratic People's Republic of Korea.

Chinese-Korean diplomatic relations were well established before the Joseon period of Korean history. In 1882, the governments of the Kingdom of Great Joseon and in Beijing established diplomatic relations.

The current official title of the incumbent diplomat is "Ambassador of the People's Republic of China to the Democratic People's Republic of Korea."

List of representatives

Ministers of Imperial China 
 Hsu Sou Peng was appointed December 14, 1899.
 Hsu Tai Shen was appointed November 12, 1901.

Ambassadors of the People's Republic 
Diplomatic relations since .

See also
 China-Korea Treaty of 1882
 List of diplomatic missions in North Korea

Notes

References
 Halleck, Henry Wager. (1861).  International law: or, Rules regulating the intercourse of states in peace and war 	New York: D. Van Nostrand. OCLC 852699
 Korean Mission to the Conference on the Limitation of Armament, Washington, D.C., 1921-1922. (1922). Korea's Appeal to the Conference on Limitation of Armament. Washington: U.S. Government Printing Office. OCLC 12923609

 
Korea North
China